Brandon Newey (born August 18, 1992) is an American racing driver. He was classified second in the 2012 F1600 Championship Series season. In 2014 he is competing in the Pro Mazda Championship.

Karting
Brandon started his career in karts at New Castle Motorsports Park where he raced in various regional and track championships. He made also three appearances at the RoboPong 200 endurance karting race. Fourth was his best result when he partnered up with Josef Newgarden. Brandon also raced in selected WKA Manufacturer's Cup events.

Formula racing
Brandon Newey made his competitive debut in formula cars in the Skip Barber National Championship in 2010. His best results were two fifth-place finishes at Virginia Motorsports Park and Road Atlanta. He eventually finished eighth in the championship. He also raced in the Skip Barber Summer Series. He started eight races and finished once on the podium.

For 2011 he again raced in the Skip Barber National Championship. He scored his first win in the second race at Sebring International Raceway. Brandon also won at Road America. He was in the race for the championship for a long time but with a total of 10 podium finishes he was eventually placed third in the championship, behind Trent Hindman and champion Scott Anderson.

Brandon signed with Bryan Herta Autosport, for whom he raced various kart races before, to compete in the F1600 Championship Series. Brandon was placed first in the first one-two finish for Bryan Herta Autosport, in only the second race of the season. Brandon was placed first and his teammate Garett Grist second in Honda Fit powered Mygale SJ12's. Brandon Newey went on to win a total of four races including the season finale. He eventually finished second in the championship standings 7 points behind Matias Köykkä.

At the end of the 2011 season Brandon tested a U.S. F2000 in Griffis Memorial Test at the Indianapolis Motor Speedway road course with JDC Motorsports. For the 2013 season Brandon signed with Afterburner Autosport to race in the U.S. F2000 National Championship. He finished 12th in points, competing in twelve of the fourteen races, with a best finish of fifth (twice).

In 2014 he is racing in the Pro Mazda Championship for Team Pelfrey.

Personal
His father, Steve Newey, co-owns Bryan Herta Autosport. Brandon is a sophomore student at Purdue University where he studies management.

Pro Mazda Championship

References

External links
 Official website
 

1992 births
Living people
Racing drivers from Indianapolis
Indy Pro 2000 Championship drivers
U.S. F2000 National Championship drivers
Team Pelfrey drivers
Bryan Herta Autosport drivers